Arthur Knight Wallace (25 December 1879 – 21 August 1952) was an Australian politician.

He was born in Yacka to storekeeper Andrew Wallace and Eliza Hodge and grew up in the Mallee and gin Gippsland. He served in the Second Boer War and after his return became a member of the Victorian Socialist Party. On 10 December 1908 he married Elizabeth Ahern, with whom he had two children. He lived in Adelaide from 1910 to 1916, when he returned to Melbourne as a carpenter. He became president of the Carpenters' Union and served on South Melbourne City Council from 1928 to 1937 (mayor 1933–34). In 1919 he won a by-election for the Victorian Legislative Assembly seat of Albert Park, representing the Labor Party. He was defeated in 1927 but re-elected in 1929. He supported the Premiers' Plan, and so left the Labor Party, retiring in 1932. Wallace died in South Melbourne in 1952.

References

1879 births
1952 deaths
Australian Labor Party members of the Parliament of Victoria
Members of the Victorian Legislative Assembly